"Bye Bye" is Beni's seventh single under the label Nayutawave Records. The leading song is the ending theme for the program Hey! Hey! Hey! Music Champ. 
The single was ranked as #57 on the Oricon weekly chart and sold 1,171 copies so far.

Track list

References

2010 singles
Beni (singer) songs
Songs with lyrics by Shoko Fujibayashi
2010 songs